Katie Vincent is an American film actress, screenwriter, producer, singer / songwriter based in New York City, best known for her roles in Pickings and Prego.

Personal life and career

Katie Vincent grew up in Mansfield, Massachusetts. She attended New York University Tisch School of the Arts where she earned her BFA in drama. As an actress, Vincent appeared in Prego, Pitckings, Death (and Disco Fries), and Before the Snow, starring Natalya Rudakova. She also served as a producer, music supervisor and singer/songwriter for Pickings. Katie was responsible for creating the music for the film's original soundtrack. Her song "The Way it Goes" won the "Best Country & Western Song" at the American Songwriting Awards in 2019. Vincent also wrote, directed and produced her debut directorial film "Windblown" alongside Usher Morgan in 2019.

Filmography
 BadPuss: A Popumentary (2014)
 Prego (2015)
 Before the Snow  (2015)
 For 20 (2016)
 Hotel (2016) 
 The Grey Matter Archives (TV Series) (2016)
 555-Sexy (2017) 
 Death: and Disco Fries (2018) 
 Unfettered (2018) 
 Pickings (2018)
 Trapped Inside (2018)
 The Last Frost (2019)
 Windblown (2019)
 The Thing with Feathers'' (2022)

References

External links

Living people
Actors from Massachusetts
New York University alumni
People from Boston
Year of birth missing (living people)